Nangal Thathal is a village in the Hoshiarpur district of Punjab, India.

Cities and towns in Hoshiarpur district